A Small Article Monitor or SAM is a monitoring device designed to screen small items of up to 50 pounds weight for radioactive contamination. It uses six plastic scintillation detectors, one each on the top, bottom, back, left and right sides of the chamber, plus one in the door. Operation of the instrument is controlled from an integral terminal. The instrument performs a self-test and acquires a new Background count each time it is powered up. It also monitors its own operation during normal use and indicates any failures. It runs continuously, updating backgrounds whenever no weight is detected inside the chamber. A new count is initiated every time a door open/door close sequence is detected.

Because of overall interference a Geiger counter would be rendered ineffective within the walls of a nuclear containment building for screening individual articles (i.e., clothing, tools, etc.) for specific contamination. A SAM can measure nuclear contamination of specific articles without interference from its outside environment due to the thickness of its lead casing. SAMs range in weight from 1900lbs to 3500lbs.

Particle detectors